The Coleco Telstar brand is a series of dedicated first-generation home video game consoles produced, released and marketed by Coleco from 1976 to 1978. Starting with Coleco Telstar Pong clone based video game console on General Instrument's AY-3-8500 chip in 1976, there were 14 consoles released in the Coleco Telstar series. About one million units of the first model called Coleco Telstar were sold.

The large product lineup and the impending fading out of the Pong machines led Coleco to face near-bankruptcy in 1980.

Model comparison

References

External links
 The ColecoVision, with 1982 TV commercial
 Pong-Story: All Coleco Telstar systems, with photos
 Telstar and other systems
 The Dot Eaters entry on the history of Telstar and Coleco
 The COLECO Story by Ralph H. Baer
 Feature titled "THE MOST BIZARRE CONSOLE FLOPS IN GAMING HISTORY" by ADAM JAMES at SVG.com

Coleco consoles
Dedicated consoles
First-generation video game consoles
Home video game consoles
Light guns
Monochrome video game consoles
Pong variations
Products introduced in 1976
1970s toys
1976 in video gaming